Mikheil Makhviladze (born 22 July 1978 in Tbilisi) is a Georgian professional football player. Currently, he plays for FC Sioni Bolnisi.

External links
 Career summary by playerhistory.com

1978 births
Living people
Footballers from Georgia (country)
Expatriate footballers from Georgia (country)
Expatriate footballers in Azerbaijan
Simurq PIK players
Georgia (country) international footballers
FC Dinamo Batumi players
Association football defenders
Expatriate sportspeople from Georgia (country) in Azerbaijan